Edith Struben (born Edith Frances Mary Struben) (1868 Pretoria - 21 October 1936 Newlands, Cape Town) was a South African botanical illustrator and painter. She was the eldest daughter of Harry Struben, a pioneer gold miner on the Witwatersrand.

In 1885 Fred and Harry Struben discovered alluvial gold on the farm Wilgespruit (now the Kloofendal Nature Reserve) in Roodepoort. At that stage Edith was a mature 16-year-old and taking care of Charles (9) and Enid (5) since their mother was frail and living in Pietermaritzburg. She did the housekeeping of a small cottage at Little Falls, cooked for the two youngsters and schooled them at home. She also found time to sew and paint, depicting the wild flowers she came across, landscapes, and the tented camp close to the mining operations. Fred and Harry eventually sold all their claims and property and retired to Cape Town. Harry built 'Strubenheim', a mansion which currently serves the Music Department of the University of Cape Town. The family counted Rudyard Kipling and Cecil John Rhodes as close friends.

Edith studied fine art in Paris, Rome and London, returning to South Africa in 1901 and exhibiting her watercolour landscapes regularly. She became one of the first members of the South African Society of Artists. Her works are in the collections of the Africana Museum in Johannesburg, the Pretoria Art Museum and the South African National Gallery in Cape Town.

In 1920 she took over 'Luncarty', a Cape Peninsula gabled house in Upper Holly Street, Newlands, Cape Town and close to Kirstenbosch. This had been designed by Francis Kaye Kendall who was one of the business partners of Herbert Baker, for Commander Sereld Hay of the Royal Naval Volunteer Reserve, South African Division.

She was a staunch supporter of the early Botanical Society of South Africa, being vice-president at the time of her death in 1936. Her exposure to the garden stonework and paths of Italy and the Mediterranean led to her involvement in the planning and execution of the stone paths at Kirstenbosch.

The succulent Mesembryanthemum strubeniae L.Bolus now known as Ruschia strubeniae Schwantes was named in Edith's honour by her friend Louisa Bolus, as was Watsonia strubeniae L.Bolus.

Family
Edith's siblings were Arthur, Gertrude, Beatrice Mary, Fredrick, Robert, Charles, Enid (24 November 1879 Pretoria - 10 February 1966 London). Enid eventually married Commander Dudley de Chair (1864-1958) in 1903 in Torwood near Torquay, Devon.

References

External links

1868 births
1936 deaths
Botanical illustrators
South African painters
South African women painters
19th-century South African women
20th-century South African women artists